Ghetto Music is the debut album by American trumpeter Eddie Gale recorded in 1968 and released on the Blue Note label.

Reception
The Allmusic review by Thom Jurek awarded the album 5 stars and stated "The aesthetic and cultural merits of Eddie Gale's Ghetto Music cannot be overstated... This is an apocryphal album, one that seamlessly blends the new jazz of the '60s with gospel, soul, and the blues... This is some of the most spiritually engaged, forward-thinking, and finely wrought music of 1968". In 2022, in a contemporary review, Pitchfork (website) called the album 'a spiritually charged masterpiece .., a controlled and chaotic blend of free jazz, meditative soul, and gospel' and awarded it a 9.4 out of 10.

Track listing
All compositions by Eddie Gale
 "The Rain" - 6:30
 "Fulton Street" - 6:51
 "A Understanding" - 7:41
 "A Walk With Thee" - 6:09
 "The Coming of Gwilu" - 13:37
Recorded at Rudy Van Gelder Studio, Englewood Cliffs, New Jersey on September 20, 1968.

Personnel
Eddie Gale - trumpet, thumb piano, steel drum, bird whistle
Russell Lyle - tenor saxophone, flute
Jo Ann Gale Stevens - guitar, vocals
James "Tokio" Reid, Judah Samuel - bass
Richard Hackett, Thomas Holman  - drums
Elaine Beener - lead vocals
Sylvia Bibbs, Barbara Dove, Evelyn Goodwin, Art Jenkins, Fulumi Prince, Edward Walrond, Sondra Walston, Mildred Weston, Norman Wright - vocals

References

Blue Note Records albums
Eddie Gale albums
1968 debut albums
Albums recorded at Van Gelder Studio
Albums produced by Francis Wolff